Tayler Bequest District Hospital is a Provincial government funded hospital in the Elundini Local Municipality area in Mount Fletcher, Eastern Cape in South Africa.

The hospital departments include Emergency department, Paediatric ward, Maternity ward, Obstetrics/Gynecology, Out Patients Department, Surgical Services, Medical Services, Operating Theatre & CSSD Services, Pharmacy, Anti-Retroviral (ARV) treatment for HIV/AIDS, Post Trauma Counseling Services, X-ray Services, Physiotherapy, NHLS Laboratory, Oral Health Care Provides, Laundry Services, Kitchen Services and Mortuary.

References
 Eastern Cape Department of Health website - Joe Gqabi District Hospitals

Hospitals in the Eastern Cape
Joe Gqabi District Municipality